The FAI Cup 2005 was the 85th staging of The Football Association of Ireland Challenge Cup or FAI Cup. It officially kicked off in late April, when twenty clubs from the junior and intermediate leagues battled it out for the chance to face League of Ireland opposition in the second round. The ten winners of those ties were joined in the second round by the 22 eircom League of Ireland clubs. The competition ran until early December, with the final taking place on Sunday, December 4.

First round
Fixtures played weekend April 24

Lissadel United         3-0       Rockmount

St Mary's   1-4   Avondale United

Cherry Orchard   0-0    Belgrove

Bangor Celtic     1-2    Wayside Celtic

Douglas Hall  2-0    Moyle Park

Mount Merrion           2-2       Galway Hibernians

St Peter's (Athlone)      0-0      Carew Park

Waterford Crystal   2-0       Bonagee United

Westport United         1-2       Fanad United

Malahide United         3-2       Glenmore / Dundrum

Replays
Belgrove                1-2       Cherry Orchard

Galway Hibernians       0-0       Mount Merrion (3-0 pen)

Carew Park   3-2       St Peter's, Athlone

Second round
Matches played on the weekend of Sunday, 12 June 2005.

Third round
Matches played on the weekend of Sunday, 28 August 2005.

Quarter-finals

Semi-finals

Final

External links
2005 FAI Cup on rsssf.com

 
2005
2

lt:Airijos futbolo varžybos 2005 m.